Shenyang Army Golden Lions, or Shenbu Golden Lions, was a Chinese women's professional basketball club in the Women's Chinese Basketball Association, owned by the Shenyang Military Region. The team was based in Liaoning province except for the 2004 season, during which it played its home games in Dalang, Dongguan, Guangdong.

Season-by-season records

Notable players

 Li Dongmei (2002)
 Hu Xiaotao (2002–11)
 Zhang Hanlan (2002–12, 2016–17)
 Liu Dan (2002–16)
 Song Liwei (2008–13)
 Zhao Shuang (2008–17)
 Miao Lijie (2009–13, 2014–15)
 Li Meng (2012–18)

References

 
Defunct women's sports teams
Basketball teams disestablished in 2018
Sport in Dongguan